Harutalcis is a genus of moths in the family Geometridae described by Sato in 1993.

Species
Harutalcis atrostipata (Walker, 1862)
Harutalcis fumigata (Bastelberger, 1909)
Harutalcis glaucodisca (Swinhoe, 1894)
Harutalcis godavariensis Sato, 1993
Harutalcis megaspilaria (Moore, 1868)
Harutalcis vialis (Moore, 1888)

References

Ennominae